The 2012–13 San Francisco Dons women's basketball team represented the University of San Francisco in the 2012–13 college basketball season. This was head coach Jennifer Azzi's third season at San Francisco. The Dons, members of the West Coast Conference, played their home games at the War Memorial Gymnasium and finished the season 12–19, 4–12 in WCC play to finish 8th in the conference.

Before the season
The Dons were picked to finish ninth in the WCC.

Roster

Schedule and results

|-
!colspan=12 style="background:#FFCC33; color:#006633;"| Exhibition Season

|-
!colspan=9 style="background:#006633; color:#FFCC33;"| Regular Season

|-
!colspan=9 style="background:#FFCC33; color:#006633;"| 2013 West Coast Conference women's basketball tournament

Rankings

See also
2012–13 San Francisco Dons men's basketball team
San Francisco Dons women's basketball

References

San Francisco Dons women's basketball seasons
San Francisco
San Francisco Dons
San Francisco Dons